Settar Tanrıöğen (born 15 July 1962) is a Turkish actor.

Selected filmography

Film

Television

References

External links
 

1962 births
Living people
Turkish male film actors
Turkish male television actors
People from Denizli